Ciara Chantel Hanna is an American actress and model. She is known for playing the roles of Gia Moran in Power Rangers Megaforce and Nicole Parker in Blood Lake: Attack of the Killer Lampreys.

Early life
 
Hanna was born in Orange, California, as the first of three children to Mark and Kimberly Hanna. She has a younger sister, Krystal Hanna, and a younger brother, Dalton Hanna. She attended Martin Luther King High School in Riverside, California, and graduated in 2009.

Career
 

Hanna entered the entertainment industry at the age of 8, traveling around California with a singing group. At age 10, she started acting and modeling, producing commercials for Orange and modeling for companies such as Mattel, Robinsons-May, and Macy's. In 2009, she was a semifinalist in 13th season of America's Next Top Model, which specifically scouted models who are 5'7" and under, but she did not make it to the final cast. In 2012, she was cast as Gia Moran, the Megaforce Yellow Ranger, in the television series Power Rangers Megaforce.

She then went on to make many appearances in numerous shows and music videos. She is currently known for being a model.

Personal life
Hanna dated the lead singer of Waterparks, Awsten Knight, from 2015 until December 2017.  On the 30th of August 2020, she became engaged to Chase Pino. Around September 2020, the couple expected a child. On March 15, 2021, she gave birth to a baby boy named Canyon Cruz Pino.

Filmography

Film

Television

Music video

References

External links

21st-century American actresses
Actresses from Riverside, California
American film actresses
American television actresses
Living people
American Christians
Year of birth missing (living people)